Life Won't Wait is the fourth studio album by the American punk rock band Rancid. It was released on June 30, 1998 through Epitaph Records. It was released as the follow-up to ...And Out Come the Wolves (1995).

Writing and production

Around early 1997, still riding high off of the success of ...And Out Come the Wolves, Rancid decided to immediately enter the studio following the ...And Out Come the Wolves tour to record the next album. The recording of Life Won't Wait took place in the United States (from San Francisco to Los Angeles, New York City, New Orleans) and Jamaica. Two of the songs were recorded in Kingston: "Hoover Street" and the title track, "Life Won't Wait". With the cooperation of numerous Jamaican reggae artists (such as Buju Banton) is very distinctive on this album, not just in the vocals, but also in instrumental parts, which all makes Life Won't Wait very different from most of the other Rancid releases. It is also the only album by the band to date not to feature producer/engineer Brett Gurewitz in any capacity, with Armstrong and Frederiksen opting to produce the album themselves.

During the writing process the band had recorded over 50 songs, many still unreleased. Some of the released non-album tracks ended up on singles, compilations, and the B Sides and C Sides collections. The song "Emelia" was co-written by Vic Ruggiero and recorded during these sessions. The song was later re-written and featured on Vic's first solo album in 2001.
The cover photo pays homage to John Lennon's Rock 'n' roll and Neil Young's After the Gold Rush cover designs.

Reception

Life Won't Wait was released on June 30, 1998, and was the final Rancid album for 16 years to be released through Epitaph Records (until Honor Is All We Know). After its release, the band moved to frontman Tim Armstrong's label (a sub-label of Epitaph), Hellcat Records, who released their next album, 2000's Rancid. Although not as successful as ...And Out Come the Wolves, the album peaked at number 35 on the Billboard 200 album chart, making it one of Rancid's highest ranking albums.

Stephen Thomas Erlewine of Allmusic described the album as having a ska influence. He praised the music as a "powerful slice of old-school punk — as powerful as any of their records" and claims "it actually sounds a lot like ...And Out Come the Wolves". The album received a rating of three and a half out of five stars.

Track listing

Personnel
 Tim Armstrong – vocals, guitar, producer, engineer, mixing, cover photo
 Lars Frederiksen – vocals, guitar, engineer, producer, cover photo
 Matt Freeman – bass guitar
 Brett Reed – drums

Additional musicians
 Buju Banton – additional vocals on track 5
 Dicky Barrett – additional vocals on tracks 4 and 13
 Billie Joe Armstrong – backing vocals (Hey Hos) on track 2 
 Lester Butler – harmonica on track 1
 Roddy Byers – guitar on track 8
 Simon Chardiet – guitar on track 19
 Alex Désert – backing vocals on track 3
 DJ Q-Maxx 420 (Marq Lyn) – backing vocals on track 6
 Santa Fazio – harmonica on track 14
 Lynval Golding – additional vocals on track 8
 Dave Hillyard – saxophone on tracks 11 and 18
 Dr. Israel – vocals on track 22
 Thomas Johnson- percussion on track 12
 Kristin Krisapline- gang vocals on track 2
 Ollie Lattgenau – backing vocals on tracks 10 and 15
 Greg Lee – backing vocals on track 3
 Roger Miret – backing vocals on track 20
 Mark Mullins – trombone on tracks 11 and 18
 Stephen Perkins – steel drums on track 22
 Howie Pyro - gang vocals on track 2
 Marky Ramone - gang vocals on track 2
 Vic Ruggiero – B3 organ on tracks 5, 8-9, 11, 13, 18, 21, piano on 5, 9, 12, 14, 18, 21, percussion on 5 and 18, guitar on 12
 Jamil Sharif – trumpet on tracks 11 and 18
 Neville Staple – additional vocals on track 8
 Tim Shaw - gang vocals on track 2
 Eric Stefani – piano on track 3
 Will Wheaton – backing vocals on tracks 11 and 21

Production
 Thomas Johnson (music producer) – percussion, engineer, mixing
 Bob Ludwig – mastering
 Jerry Finn – mixing
 Jim Albert – engineering
 Robi Banerji – engineering
 Albert Cayati – engineering
 Michael "Cooley" Cooper – engineering
 Kevin Dena – engineering
 John Ewing, Jr. – engineering
 Grace Falconer – engineering
 Lior Goldenberg – engineering
 Cappy Japngie – engineering
 Walter Mauceri – engineering
 Spencer Ledyard – engineering
 Steve Mixdorf – engineering
 Jonathan Mooney – engineering
 Michael Penketh - engineering
 Ronnie Rivera – engineering
 Michael Rosen – engineering
 Kevin Smith – engineering
 Rohan "Jimjay" Stephens – engineering
 Claus Trelby – engineering
 John Tyree – engineering
 Howard Willing – engineering
 Joe Zook – engineering
 Jesse Fischer – artwork, photography

Charts

References

Rancid (band) albums
1998 albums
Epitaph Records albums